The Tianjin dialect is a Mandarin dialect spoken in the city of Tianjin, China. It is comprehensible to speakers of other Mandarin dialects, though its greatest deviation from the others lies in its individual tones, and the lack of retroflex consonants. The regional characteristics make the dialect an important part of the Tianjin city identity, and sharply contrasts with the dialect of nearby Beijing, despite relatively similar phonology.

Characteristics
The Tianjin dialect is classified under Jilu Mandarin, a subdivision of Mandarin Chinese dialects also spoken in Hebei and Shandong provinces.  Despite Tianjin being a neighbour of Beijing, its dialect sounds very different from the Beijing dialect, which is the basis for Standard Chinese.

The tones of the Tianjin dialect correspond to those of the Beijing dialect (and hence Standard Chinese) as follows:

The differences are minor except for the first tone: Where it is high and level in Beijing, it is low and falling in Tianjin. All words with the first tone, including the name "Tianjin", are affected, giving the Tianjin dialect a downward feel to people from Beijing.

The Tianjin dialect also includes four tone sandhi rules, more than the Beijing dialect. They are,
Tone 1 + Tone 1 → Tone 3-Tone 1: 天津 tiān jīn is pronounced /tǐanjīn/ (using Pinyin tone diacritics)
Tone 3 + Tone 3 → Tone 2-Tone 3: 水果 shuǐ guǒ is pronounced /shuíguǒ/ (as in Standard)
Tone 4 + Tone 4 → Tone 1-Tone 4: 現在 xiàn zài is pronounced /xiānzài/
Tone 4 + Tone 1 → Tone 2-Tone 1: 上班 shàng bān is pronounced /shángbān/

There are some other patterns that differentiate the Tianjin dialect from the Beijing dialect. One is the pronunciation of 饿 (餓) as wò (臥) instead of è.

Lastly, the Tianjin dialect lacks the retroflex consonants prevalent in Beijing, not unlike Taiwanese Mandarin. However, the use of the -er (儿) diminutive is common in the Tianjin dialect, as it is throughout the north and northeast. (See: Erhua.)

Chinese speakers commonly stereotype the Tianjin dialect as aggressive- or confrontational-sounding, though it is not difficult for speakers of other Mandarin dialects to understand.

See also
List of Chinese dialects

References

Further reading
 

Mandarin Chinese
Dialect